The 1952 SCCA National Sports Car Championship season was the second season of the Sports Car Club of America's National Sports Car Championship. It began March 8, 1952, and ended October 26, 1952, after eleven races.  Sherwood Johnston won the season championship.

Schedule

 Feature race

Season results
Note: Although support races counted towards the season points championship, only feature race overall winners are listed below.

 Race not completed due to fatal accident involving spectators.

External links
World Sports Racing Prototypes: SCCA 1952
Racing Sports Cars: SCCA archive
Etceterini: 1952 program covers

SCCA National Sports Car Championship
Scca National Sports Car Championship
1952 in American motorsport